Bradshaws or Bradshaw's can refer to:

 The Bradshaws, British fictional radio serial
 Bradshaw's Guide, a series of railway timetables and travel guide books
 Bradshaw's Guide to Victoria (Australia)
 Bradshaw's Ferry, crossing point on the Colorado River

Depreciated usage 
 Bradshaw rock paintings was the colonial name for Gwion Gwion rock paintings